Puliciphora is a genus of scuttle flies (insects in the family Phoridae). There are at least 110 described species in Puliciphora.

See also
 List of Puliciphora species

References

Further reading

 
 

Phoridae
Articles created by Qbugbot
Platypezoidea genera